Escadron de Transport 68 Antilles-Guyane is a French Air and Space Force squadron located at Cayenne – Félix Eboué Airport, French Guiana, France which operates the Aérospatiale SA 330 Puma, Eurocopter Fennec and the CASA/IPTN CN-235.

See also

 List of French Air and Space Force aircraft squadrons

References

French Air and Space Force squadrons